The Grotte Casteret, also known by its Spanish names Gruta de Casteret or Gruta Helada de Casteret, is a limestone ice cave, located high in the Spanish Pyrenees, within the Ordesa y Monte Perdido National Park.

Description

Large ice columns dominate the end of the chamber. To the left of the chamber an opening leads into the Salle Maude at the base of a  ice-wall called Niagara.

Beyond the Grande Salle, the ice floor gives way to a mainly boulder-floored  passage which leads after  leads to a  climb which emerges in a lapiaz field on the surface. Casteret's original survey shows the passage extending for a further , but this is no longer accessible.

A third entrance, the Puits Florence, lies on the plateau above the cave.

History

The cave was first entered by the family Casteret (Norbert Casteret, his mother, his wife, and his brother) in July 1926 when they explored most of the main passage. He and his wife returned in September 1926 when they achieved the through trip. The Salle Maude was discovered and explored in August 1950 by Casteret and his daughters Maude and Gilberte. The third entrance, the Puits Florence, was first descended in August 1975 by the Club Martel.

Geology and formation
The Grotte Casteret is formed in Cretaceous limestone. The ice in the Grande Salle is ponded and has formed as the result of cold air flowing through the system, with areas out of the draught being water. The deeper ice is considered to be very old, and possibly relict of a cold period of the Quaternary. The volume of ice in the Grande Salle has decreased since its discovery.

Access

Access is controlled by the Ordesa y Monte Perdido National Park authorities. A barrier has been erected within the entrance, and a sign prohibits access to the casual visitor. Two groups of up to 6 cavers, are allowed access for a maximum of four days per month.

References

Notes

Sources

 
 

Caves of Spain
Ice caves
Limestone caves
Landforms of Aragon